Neolinguistics is the school of linguistics founded by Matteo Bartoli as a reaction to the Neogrammarians. Along with the Neoidealists it was one of the main rivals of the Neogrammarians, until structuralism, which emerged from the Neogrammarian tradition, got the upper hand. 

The neolinguists deemphasized the importance of tree structures in the relationship of languages, and emphasized the importance of variation, especially geographic variation.

References
Bartoli, Matteo 1925. Introduzione alla neolinguistica (principi, scopi, metodi).  Biblioteca dell'«Archivum Romanicum». Serie II: Linguistica, vol. 12. L.S. Olschki.
Linguistics
Hall, Robert A. Jr. 1946  Bartoli's 'Neolinguistica', Language, Vol. 22, No. 4, pp. 273-283